Renigunta is a neighbourhood and suburb of Tirupati located in Tirupati district of the Indian state of Andhra Pradesh. Tirupati Airport is located in Renigunta. It is a part of Tirupati urban agglomeration. It is also the mandal headquarters of Renigunta mandal in Tirupati district. It also falls in the jurisdictional limit of Tirupati Urban Development Authority.

Transport 

It has road connectivity by means of national and state highways. Kadapa Chennai National Highway 716 (India) NH 716 connects Tirupati with Chennai in Tamil Nadu and National Highway 71 that connects Madanapalle with Nayudupeta also passes through it. Bus services operated by APSRTC provides local transport for the people. Renigunta Junction is one of the main junctions that connects Chennai-Bangalore line and the Guntakal–Chennai Egmore section of Mumbai–Chennai line. Tirupati Airport serves passengers of Tirupati.

Education 
The primary and secondary school education is imparted by government, aided and private schools, under the School Education Department of the state. The medium of instruction followed by different schools are English, Telugu.

References 

Tirupati
Mandal headquarters in Tirupati district